Rasim Mutuk (1897 – 1973) was a Turkish engineer and antisemitic politician, who was one of the initiators of the 1934 Thrace pogroms.

References 

1897 births
1973 deaths
Place of death missing
People from Tekirdağ
Republican People's Party (Turkey) politicians